Petříkov is a municipality and village in České Budějovice District in the South Bohemian Region of the Czech Republic. It has about 300 inhabitants.

Administrative parts
The village of Těšínov is an administrative part of Petříkov.

References

Villages in České Budějovice District